St Mary Aldermanbury was a parish church in the City of London first mentioned in 1181 and destroyed by the Great Fire of London in 1666. Rebuilt in Portland stone by Christopher Wren, it was again gutted by the Blitz in 1940, leaving only the walls standing. These stones were transported to Fulton, Missouri in 1966, by the residents of that town, and rebuilt in the grounds of Westminster College as a memorial to Winston Churchill. Churchill had made his Sinews of Peace, "Iron Curtain" speech in the Westminster College Gymnasium in 1946.

The footprint of the church remains at the junction of London's Aldermanbury and Love Lane, planted with bushes and trees;  a memorial plaque has been placed by Westminster College in the footprint. The gardens also house a monument to Henry Condell and John Heminges, key figures in the production of the First Folio of William Shakespeare's plays and co-partners with him in the Globe Theatre. Condell and Heminges lived in the St Mary Aldermanbury parish and were buried in its churchyard. This monument is topped with a bust of Shakespeare. The remains of the church were designated a Grade II listed building on 5 June 1972. The monuments are separately listed.

In the 1830s, the notable missionary William Jowett was a lecturer at the church.

Burials
Notable burials in the church included the notorious "hanging judge" Judge Jeffreys.  Of the interment of Judge Jeffreys, Leigh Hunt wrote:  "Jeffreys was taken on the twelfth of September, 1688. He was first interred privately in the Tower; but three years afterwards, when his memory was something blown over, his friends obtained permission, by a warrant of the queen's dated September 1692, to take his remains under their own care, and he was accordingly reinterred in a vault under the communion table of St. Mary, Aldermanbury, 2nd Nov. 1694. In 1810, during certain repairs, the coffin was uncovered for a time, and the public had a sight of the box containing the mortal remains of the feared and hated magistrate."

Also buried in the church were:

Edmund Calamy, Presbyterian minister, who was the perpetual curate of St Mary Aldermanbury 1639–1662.
Edmund Calamy the Younger, a preacher removed by the Great Ejection
Edmund Calamy III, historian and Presbyterian minister
Edmund Calamy IV, his son, dissenting minister 
Henry Condell, actor, member of the King's Men
William Damsell, Receiver-General of the Court of Wards and Liveries and a Member of Parliament
Thomas Digges, astronomer who is believed to have been the first person to postulate in print that the universe is infinite
John Heminges, actor, member of the King's Men
James Janeway, Puritan author and minister
William Painter, author

Marriage

 In 1656 the poet John Milton married his second wife, Elizabeth Woodcock, at St Mary's.

See also 

 List of demolished buildings and structures in London
 List of Christopher Wren churches in London

Footnotes

Further reading

External links
Church of St. Mary the Virgin, Aldermanbury - Churchill Memorial - Fulton, Missouri

12th-century establishments in England
1966 disestablishments in England
English Baroque church buildings
Churches rebuilt after the Great Fire of London but since demolished
Grade II listed churches in London
Aldermanbury
Parks and open spaces of the City of London Corporation
Christopher Wren church buildings in London
Relocated buildings and structures in the United Kingdom